Nazarabad (also Romanized as Naz̧arābād) is a village in Doab Rural District, in the Central District of Selseleh County, Lorestan Province, Iran. At the 2006 census, its population was 119, in 21 families.

References 

Towns and villages in Selseleh County